Caloola, or The Adventures of a Jackeroo is a 1911 Australian silent film directed by Alfred Rolfe based on a novel published the previous year by Clement Pratt.

It is considered a lost film.

Plot
An Englishman, Charlie Hargreaves, is falsely accused of an embezzlement and goes to Australia, where he finds work as a jackeroo at Caloola Station. He falls in love with Hilda, the station owner's daughter, but they are both captured by aboriginals.

The girl's parents arrange a search party and come to the rescue, but the chief of the tribe takes the girl. He is about to throw her over a cliff when the jackeroo comes to the rescue. He encounters a bushfire and manages to escape death in a watery grave.

Chapter headings were:
Falsely' accused, Dismissed, 
A stranger in a strange land, 
The Jackeroo, 
At Caloola,
Mutual admiration, 
The bush fire,
The' alarm,
At the point of death, 
A timely rescue, 
Love's awakening,
A cowardly assault,
Captured by Black,
Saved from a watery grave,
Off for the honeymoon.

Cast
Charles Villiers

Release
The movie was advertised as being available for release on 4 October 1911.

The bushfire sequence was heavily promoted in advertising.

One report said the film had been "a strong draw".

References

External links
 
Caloola, or the Adventures of a Jackeroo film at AustLit
Original novel at AustLit

1911 films
Australian black-and-white films
Australian silent short films
Lost Australian films
Films directed by Alfred Rolfe